The men's high jump event  at the 1991 IAAF World Indoor Championships was held on 9 and 10 March.

Medalists

Results

Qualification
Qualification: 2.24 (Q) or at least 12 best performers (q) qualified for the final.

Final

References

High
High jump at the World Athletics Indoor Championships